Sir Simon Philip Baron-Cohen  (born 15 August 1958) is a British clinical psychologist and professor of developmental psychopathology at the University of Cambridge. He is the director of the university's Autism Research Centre and a Fellow of Trinity College. In 1985, Baron-Cohen formulated the mind-blindness theory of autism, the evidence for which he collated and published in 1995. In 1997, he formulated the foetal sex steroid theory of autism, the key test of which was published in 2015.

He has also made major contributions to the fields of typical cognitive sex differences, autism prevalence and screening, autism genetics, autism neuroimaging, autism and technical ability, and synaesthesia. Baron-Cohen was knighted in the 2021 New Year Honours for services to autistic people.

Early life and education
Baron-Cohen was born into a middle-class Jewish family in London. He has an elder brother Dan Baron Cohen and three younger siblings, brother Ash Baron-Cohen and sisters Suzie and Liz. His cousins include actor and comedian Sacha Baron Cohen and composer Erran Baron Cohen.

He completed a BA in human sciences at New College, Oxford, and an MPhil in clinical psychology at the Institute of Psychiatry, King's College London. He received a PhD in psychology at University College London; his doctoral research was in collaboration with his supervisor Uta Frith.

Autism research
In 1997 Baron-Cohen developed the "empathizing-systemizing (E-S) theory" which states that humans may be classified on the basis of their scores along two dimensions (empathizing and systemizing). The E-S theory argues that typical females on average score higher on empathizing relative to systemizing (they are more likely to have a brain of type E), and typical males on average score higher on systemizing relative to empathizing (they are more likely to have a brain of type S). Autistic people are predicted to score as an extreme of the typical male (they are more likely to have a brain of type S or extreme type S).

Baron-Cohen's "assortative mating theory" that if individuals with a "systemizing" focus or "type S" brain are selecting each other as mates, they are more likely to have children with autism.  This has been supported in a population study in Eindhoven, where autism rates are twice as high in that city that is an IT hub, compared to other Dutch cities.

In 2001 he developed the autism-spectrum quotient (AQ), a set of fifty questions that can be used to help determine whether or not an adult exhibits symptoms of autism. The AQ has subsequently been used in hundreds of studies including one study of half a million people, showing robust sex differences and higher scores in those who work in STEM.

Prenatal neuroendocrinology 
Baron-Cohen's work in E-S theory led him to investigate whether higher levels of prenatal testosterone explain the increased rate of autism among males. His prenatal sex steroid theory of autism gained additional support in 2015 and 2019 in finding elevated prenatal androgens estrogens are associated with autism.

In his 2004 book Prenatal Testosterone in Mind (MIT Press) Baron-Cohen put forward the prenatal sex steroid theory of autism. He proposed this theory to understand why autism is more common in males. Using the Cambridge Child Development Project that he established in 1997, a longitudinal study studying children of 600 women who had undergone amniocentesis in pregnancy, he followed these children postnatally. This study demonstrated, for the first time in humans, how normative variation in amniotic prenatal testosterone levels correlates with individual differences in typical postnatal brain and behavioral development. His team discovered that in typical children, amount of eye contact, rate of vocabulary development, quality of social relationships, theory of mind performance, and scores on the empathy quotient are all inversely correlated with prenatal testosterone levels. In contrast, he found that scores on the embedded figures test (of attention to detail), on the systemizing quotient (SQ), measures of narrow interests, and number of autistic traits are positively correlated with prenatal testosterone levels. Within this study his team conducted the first human neuroimaging studies of brain grey matter regional volumes and brain activity associated with prenatal testosterone. Other clues for the theory came from Baron-Cohen's postnatal hormonal studies which found that autistic adults have elevated circulating androgens in serum and that the autistic brain in women is ‘masculinized’ in both grey and white matter brain volume. An independent animal model by Xu et al. (2015, Physiology and Behavior, 138, 13–20) showed that elevated prenatal testosterone during pregnancy leads to reduced social interest in the offspring. Baron-Cohen's group also studied the rate of autism in offspring of mothers with polycystic ovary syndrome (PCOS), a medical condition caused by elevated prenatal testosterone. He found that in women with PCOS, the odds of having a child with autism are significantly increased. This has been replicated in three other countries (Sweden, Finland, and Israel) and is in line with the finding that mothers of autistic children themselves have elevated sex steroid hormones. But to really test the theory Baron-Cohen needed a much larger sample than his Cambridge Child Development Project, since autism only occurs in 1% of the population. So, in 2015, he set up a collaboration with the Danish Biobank which has stored over 20 thousand amniotic fluid samples which he linked to later diagnosis of autism via the Danish Psychiatric Register. He tested the prenatal androgens and found that children later diagnosed as autistic were exposed to elevated levels of prenatal testosterone, and the Δ4 sex steroid precursors to prenatal testosterone. In 2019 he tested the same cohort's levels of exposure to prenatal estrogens and again found these were elevated in pregnancies that resulted in autism. These novel studies provide evidence of the role of prenatal hormones, interacting with genetic predisposition, in the cause of autism.

Developmental social cognitive neuroscience 
While a member of the Cognitive Development Unit (CDU) in London in 1985, to explain the social-communication deficits in autism, Baron-Cohen and his colleagues Frith and Alan Leslie formulated the "theory of mind" (ToM) hypothesis. ToM (also known as "cognitive empathy") is the brain's partially innate mechanism for rapidly making sense of social behavior by effortlessly attributing mental states to others, enabling behavioral prediction and social communication skills. They confirmed this using the false belief test, showing that a typical four-year-old child can infer another person's belief that is different to their own, while autistic children on average are impaired in this ability. Baron-Cohen's 1995 book Mindblindness summarized his subsequent experiments in ToM and its impairment in autism. He went on to show that children with autism are blind to the mentalistic significance of the eyes and show deficits in advanced ToM, measured by the "reading the mind in the eyes test" (or "eyes test") that he designed. He conducted the first neuroimaging study of ToM in typical and autistic adults, and studied patients demonstrating lesions in the orbito- and medial-prefrontal cortex and amygdala can impair ToM. He also reported the first evidence of atypical amygdala function in autism during ToM. In 2017, his team studied 80K genotyped individuals who took the eyes test. He found SNPs partly contribute to individual differences on this dimensional trait measure on which autistic people are impaired. This is evidence that cognitive empathy/ToM is partly heritable. This also illustrates Baron-Cohen's approach to autism genetics that relates autism to individual differences in traits such as empathy and systemizing in the general population. Mindblindness is today recognized as one of the core cognitive domains of disability in autism and the National Institutes of Health recommended Baron-Cohen's eyes test as a core measure that should be used as part of the Research Domain Criteria (RDOC) for assessing social cognition.

Baron-Cohen developed the Mindreading software for special education, which was nominated for an award from the British Academy of Film and Television Arts (BAFTA) interactive award in 2002. His lab developed The Transporters, an animation series designed to teach children with autism to recognize and understand emotions. The series was also nominated for a BAFTA award.

Reception

Baron-Cohen has faced criticism by some for his "empathizing-systemizing theory", which states that humans may be classified on the basis of their scores along two dimensions (empathizing and systemizing); and that females tend to score higher on the empathizing dimension and males tend to score higher on the systemizing dimension. Feminist scientists, including Cordelia Fine, neuroscientist Gina Rippon, and Lise Eliot have opposed his extreme male brain theory of autism, calling it "neurotrash" and neurosexism. Rippon also argues against using "male" and "female" for describing different types of brains, and that brain types do not correspond to genders. Baron-Cohen has defended the neuroscience of sex differences against charges of neurosexism, arguing that "Fine's neurosexism allegation is the mistaken blurring of science with politics.", adding that "You can be a scientist interested in the nature of sex differences while being a clear supporter of equal opportunities and a firm opponent of all forms of discrimination in society."

A book review published in Phenomenology and the Cognitive Sciences characterized The Essential Difference as "very disappointing" with a "superficial notion of intelligence", concluding that Baron-Cohen's major claims about mind-blindness and systemizing–empathizing are "at best, dubious". According to Time magazine, his views on systemising traits had "earned him the ire of some parents of autistic children, who complain that he underestimates their families' suffering". Time said that while research from Washington University in St. Louis did not support the assortative mating theory, a survey finding that autism was twice as high in Eindhoven  had "breathed new life" into Baron-Cohen's theory. Time magazine has also criticized the assortative mating theory proposed by Baron-Cohen, claiming that it is largely speculative and based on anecdotal evidence. The theory claims that autism rates are increasing because "systemizers", individuals with more autistic traits, are more likely to marry each other and are more likely to have autistic offspring due to relatively recent societal changes. James McGrath has criticized the autism-spectrum quotient, writing that the score increases if one indicates interest in mathematics, and decreases if one indicates interest in literature or art. He claims that this leads to the false notion that most autistic people are strong in math.

The developers of the software Baron-Cohen used for a 2009 study which reported that autistic individuals possessed superior visual acuity said that his results were impossible based on the technology used in the study. Baron-Cohen's team responded to this criticism by re-running the study and retracting the claim.

Baron-Cohen's supposition that Isaac Newton and Albert Einstein displayed autistic traits has been met with scepticism by UCSF psychiatrist Glenn Elliot, who writes that attempting to diagnose on the basis of biographical information is extremely unreliable, and that any behavior can have various causes.

Critics also say that because his work has focused on higher-functioning individuals with autism spectrum disorders, it requires independent replication with broader samples and that his theories are based on subjective perceptions. In response to some of these criticisms, Baron-Cohen agrees that many of his results have not been replicated, and says that he remains "open minded about these hypotheses until there are sufficient data to evaluate them". Still, he says he does not see a problem with introducing theories before definitive evidence has been collected.

Organisations
Baron-Cohen is professor of developmental psychopathology at the University of Cambridge in the United Kingdom. He is the director of the university's Autism Research Centre and a Fellow of Trinity College.

He is a Fellow of the British Psychological Society (BPS), the British Academy, the Academy of Medical Sciences, and the Association for Psychological Science. He is a BPS Chartered Psychologist and a Senior Investigator at the National Institute for Health and Care Research (NIHR).

He serves as vice-president of the National Autistic Society (UK), and was the 2012 chairman of the National Institute for Health and Care Excellence (NICE) Guideline Development Group for adults with autism. He has served as vice-president and president of the International Society for Autism Research (INSAR). He is co-editor in chief of the journal Molecular Autism.

He was the chair of the Psychology Section of the British Academy.

Recognition
Baron-Cohen was awarded the 1990 Spearman Medal from the BPS, the McAndless Award from the American Psychological Association, the 1993 May Davidson Award for Clinical Psychology from the BPS, and the 2006 presidents' Award from the BPS. He was awarded the Kanner-Asperger Medal in 2013 by the Wissenschaftliche Gesellschaft Autismus-Spektrum as a Lifetime Achievement Award for his contributions to autism research.

He was knighted in the 2021 New Year Honours for services to people with autism.

Personal life
He married Bridget Lindley, a family rights lawyer whom he had met at Oxford, in 1987. She died of breast cancer in 2016. They had three children. He is a cousin of Sacha Baron Cohen.

Selected publications

Single-authored books
 
 
 
  (published in the US as The Science of Evil: On Empathy and the Origins of Human Cruelty)
 (published in the US as )

Other books

Selected journal articles

See also 
 Childhood Autism Spectrum Test
 Sally–Anne test
 
 Spectrum 10K

References

External links 

 Profile – Department of Psychology, University of Cambridge
 "They just can't help it", Simon Baron-Cohen, The Guardian (17 April 2003)
 "The Male Condition", Simon Baron-Cohen, The New York Times Op-Ed Section (8 August 2005)
 "The Assortative Mating Theory: A Talk with Simon Baron-Cohen", Edge Foundation discussion, 2005
 "The Short Life of a Diagnosis", Simon Baron-Cohen The New York Times Op-Ed Section (9 November 2009)
 "Why a lack of empathy is the root of all evil", Clint Witchalls, The Independent (5 April 2011)
The Science of Evil: On Empathy and the Origins of Cruelty, Simon Baron-Cohen (The Montréal Review, October 2011)

1958 births
Living people
English people of Belarusian-Jewish descent
English people of German-Jewish descent
Academic journal editors
Alumni of King's College London
Alumni of New College, Oxford
Autism activists
Autism researchers
British cognitive scientists
Human sex difference researchers
Developmental psychologists
English psychologists
Fellows of the British Academy
Fellows of Trinity College, Cambridge
Fellows of the Academy of Medical Sciences (United Kingdom)
Simon
English Jewish writers
Jewish activists
Jewish scientists
Knights Bachelor
NIHR Senior Investigators